Ledingham may refer to:
 George Aleck Ledingham (1903-1962), a Canadian mycologist
 John Charles Grant Ledingham (1875-1944) Scottish pathologist and bacteriologist
 Jonathan Kelly (born Jonathan Ledingham in 1947), an Irish folk rock singer-songwriter
 Una Ledingham, British physician
 Walt Ledingham (born 1950), a professional ice hockey player